Fear of growing old may refer to:

Gerascophobia
Gerontophobia